The Thom Gunn Award is an annual literary award, presented by Publishing Triangle to honour works of gay male poetry. First presented in 2001 as the Triangle Award for Gay Poetry, the award was renamed in memory of American poet Thom Gunn, the award's first winner, following his death in 2004.

Winners
2001 — Thom Gunn, Boss Cupid
2002 — Mark Doty, Source
2003 — Greg Hewett, Red Suburb
2004 — Brian Teare, The Room Where I Was Born
2005 — Carl Phillips, The Rest of Love
2006 — Richard Siken, Crush
2007 — Justin Chin, Gutted
2008 — Steve Fellner, Blind Date with Cavafy and Daniel Hall, Under Sleep
2009 — Ely Shipley, Boy with Flower
2010 — Ronaldo V. Wilson, Poems of the Black Object
2011 — Michael Walsh, The Dirt Riddles
2012 — Henri Cole, Touch
2013 — Richard Blanco, Looking for the Gulf Motel
2014 — Charlie Bondhus, All the Heat We Could Carry
2015 — Jericho Brown, The New Testament
2016 — Rick Barot, Chord
2017 — Ocean Vuong, Night Sky with Exit Wounds
2018 — Chen Chen, When I Grow Up I Want to Be a List of Further Possibilities
2019 — Hieu Minh, Not Here
2020 — Sam Ross, Company
2021 — Mark Bibbins, 13th Balloon
2022 — John Keene, Punks

References

External links
 

Triangle Awards
American poetry awards
Awards established in 2001
LGBT poetry